FC La Habana is a Cuban football team playing in the Cuban National Football League and representing La Habana Province. They play their home games at the Estadio La Polar in Havana or in the town of Guanajay.

Achievements
Campeonato Nacional de Fútbol de Cuba: 4
 1916, 1965, 1966, 1967

Current squad
2018 Season

References

Football clubs in Cuba
Sport in Havana